Uncheon station is a railway station on the Gyeongui Line in South Korea. It is currently served by the Gyeongui-Jungang Line Munsan-Imjingang shuttle service.

The station lacks ticket vending machines. The station was planned to be abandoned entirely; however community pressure caused Korail to change its decision. The station was temporarily closed in March 2020 when the Gyeongui–Jungang Line was extended to Imjingang station as a shuttle service from Munsan, and has been relocated and reopened at the relocated location on December 17, 2022.

Station layout 

Seoul Metropolitan Subway stations
Railway stations in Gyeonggi Province
Railway stations opened in 2004
Paju